Capitularina is a genus of flowering plants belonging to the family Cyperaceae.

Its native range is Papuasia.

Species:
 Capitularina involucrata (Valck.Sur.) J.Kern

References

Cyperaceae
Cyperaceae genera
Taxa named by Johannes Hendrikus Kern
Plants described in 1974